Achim Peters (born 1957 in Dortmund) is a German internist and brain researcher. He developed the Selfish Brain Theory.

He has been a professor at the University of Lübeck since 2000 and heads the German Research Foundation (DFG)-funded  Clinical Research Group "Selfish Brain: Brain Glucose and Metabolic Syndrome", which has been in existence since 2004.

Life 
Peters attended the Humboldt High School in Dortmund until his Abitur in 1976. In the same year, he began studying medicine at the Ruhr University in Bochum; he later moved to the Medical University in Lübeck. This success was accompanied by a scholarship from the German Academic Scholarship Foundation. In 1983, Peters completed his studies with his license to practice medicine as well as his doctorate (at the Institute of Anatomy, Bochum).

In 1984, Peters joined the Clinic of Internal Medicine at the University of Lübeck. From 1986 to 1989, a DFG postdoctoral fellowship took him to the Hospital for Sick Children in Toronto, Canada, where he conducted research on "Control Theory in Diabetes Mellitus" In the following years, Peters specialized in endocrinology and diabetology within internal medicine. In 1993, he became a senior physician at the Medical Clinic 1 of Internal Medicine at the University of Lübeck.

In 1996 he was habilitated in Lübeck and received the Venia Legendi for Internal Medicine. For his publications in diabetology, he was awarded the Silvia King Prize by the German Diabetes Society. In 2000, he became an associate professor at the University of Lübeck. In 2002, he was promoted to senior physician in charge of endocrinology and diabetology at the University Hospital of Schleswig-Holstein. In 2004, Peters became head of the DFG-funded Clinical Research Group "Selfish Brain: Brain Glucose and Metabolic Syndrome". In 2006, the University of Lübeck appointed him W2 Professor of Internal Medicine/Endocrinology and Diabetology, initially for six years, and in 2009 for life. This was followed in 2008 by admission as a Member of the Faculty of 1000 Biology.

He is the author of several books.

Achim Peters is married and lives in Lübeck.

Research focus: Selfish brain theory and obesity 
In 1998 Achim Peters designed the basic model of the Selfish-Brain-Theory and formulated its axioms. In his exposition of the Selfish Brain Theory (2004), he relies on ca. 5000 published data sets of "classical" endocrinology-diabetology and modern neuroscience, but argues mathematically using differential equations as well as systems theory. This is a novel methodological approach in obesity research and diabetology; in this respect, the Selfish-Brain-Theory represents a paradigm shift.

The Selfish Brain theory states that the human brain prioritizes its own comparatively high needs in regulating the organism's energy supply. In this respect, the brain behaves in a "selfish" manner.

In the cerebral hemispheres, the integrating organ of the entire central nervous system, the theory situates the regulatory circuit of an "energy-on-demand" system, with which the ATP concentration of the neurons is kept in equilibrium (homeostasis). This goal is achieved by the allocation (partitioning) of energy from the body.

The Selfish Brain theory represents a further development of existing theories about the organization of the energy supply of the human organism. The further development consists in the fact that in place of a purely passively supplied brain, there is a brain that independently regulates its energy concentrations and assumes a primary position in a hierarchically organized energy metabolism. Blood glucose and body weight control circuits are conceived as a complex regulating food intake, controlled from hypothalamic centres. The "energy-on-demand" system supplying energy to the brain is seen as an entity superior to this area, influencing the control organs of the blood glucose and body weight control circuits. Sprengell et al. 2021 have already shown in two systematic reviews that the predictions of the Selfish Brain theory have been fulfilled in situations where the predictions of the long-held competing theories, which consider the brain as purely passively supplied, have been violated.

The development of obesity can be explained by the Selfish-Brain theory in terms of a supply chain that extends from the environment to the body to the brain as the end-user. Accordingly, obesity can be understood as an energetic "supply chain build-up." As in economic supply chains where goods are left on the shelves when customers do not buy, energy accumulates in the adipose tissue when the brain requires less energy. Reduced average energy consumption by the brain is found, for example, in people who have become accustomed to stress (so-called "stress habituation") and therefore no longer exhibit stress-induced, energy-costly arousal states.

Awards 
 1977 National winner in the German National Mathematics Competition
 1997 Silvia King Prize of the German Diabetes Society

Publications

Monographs

Editions (publisher, co-editor or co-worker)

References

External links
 
 
 Homepage Achim Peters 
 Perlentaucher

Living people
1957 births
Scientists from Dortmund
German neuroscientists
German endocrinologists